Zoarces fedorovi is an eelpout in the family Zoarcidae, found only in the northern part of the Sea of Okhotsk.

References

External links
 Zoarces fedorovi at Encyclopedia of Life.

fedorovi
Fish described in 2007
Viviparous fish
Fish of the Pacific Ocean
Fish of Asia
Fish of Russia